Jay Khalil Hughes is an American football safety who is currently a free agent.

Hughes played college football for Mississippi State. He injured his Achilles tendon in the first game of the 2013 season and missed the rest of the year, but returned in 2014 to play in all 13 games and serve as a team captain.

References

Living people
Mississippi State Bulldogs football players
St. Louis Rams players
American football safeties
People from Forrest County, Mississippi
1991 births